Yousef Hizam (Arabic:يوسف حزام) (born 7 June 1995) is an Emirati footballer who plays for Emirates Club as a defender .

External links

References

Emirati footballers
1995 births
Living people
Al Wahda FC players
Baniyas Club players
Emirates Club players
UAE First Division League players
UAE Pro League players
Association football defenders